Ancestral Temple is a 2009 Chinese historical drama directed by Yan Jian Gang and stars Ruby Lin, Wang Yu, Zhao Hong Fei, and Pan Hong. The series is aired in China on Fujian TV Station on October 6, 2009 and running for 43 episodes.

Synopsis
The ancestral temple is a family's sacred place. And in the period of time where women are considered inferiors, the ancestral temple is also a place off-limits to women. In this story about this ancestral temple, it so happens that its start and development revolves around one woman, its conclusion is unknown.

Cast and characters
 Ruby Lin as Zheng Xiu Yun
 Zhao Hong Fei as Xie Zhicheng
 Wang Yu as Xie Zhiqing
 Pan Hong as Da Nai Nai 
 Gao Ming as San Ye (Third Master)
 Zhao Liang as Xiu Cai
 Yi Zhen as Xie Ke Chang
 Wang Mao Lei as Xie Zhixiang
 Zhao Na as Li Niang
 Qi Xiao Xiao as Xie Yufen
 Chen Chu Dong as Xie Gefei
 Liu Zhe as Zhi Liu
 Sun Han Wen as Xiao Zhixiang

Production
Shooting began in August 2006 at Huangshan and ended in November. Although it was originally announced that Ancestral Temple would be broadcast in 2007, it was later postponed to October 2009.

International broadcast

References

External links
  Sina.com website

2009 Chinese television series debuts
Chinese historical television series
Television series about China